Glen Lean is on the Cowal peninsula in Argyll and Bute, Scotland. It is an obvious glacial-formed glen, with near vertical sides along part of the glen.  It runs from the head of the Holy Loch in the east to the head of Loch Striven in the west.  The only hamlet in the glen is Clachaig. The Little Eachaig River flows out of the glen, joining the River Eachaig and flows into the Holy Loch.  The Tarsan Dam is the other notable feature in the glen.

There is also the buildings at risk (unlisted) ruins of a powder mill, built c. 1840, in Clachaig.

The B836, a single-track road, goes through the glen.

References

Geography of Scotland
Glens of Cowal